The 1985 1000 km of Mugello was the opening round of the 1985 World Endurance Championship.  It took place at the Mugello Circuit, Italy on April 14, 1985.

Official results
Class winners in bold.  Cars failing to complete 75% of the winner's distance marked as Not Classified (NC).

† - #2 Rothmans Porsche was disqualified after it completed the final lap of the race too slowly.

Statistics
 Pole Position - #4 Martini Racing - 1:39.07
 Fastest Lap - #4 Martini Racing - 1:45.79
 Average Speed - 166.152 km/h

References

 
 

Mugello
Mugello
April 1985 sports events in Europe